Barracas may refer to:
 Barracas, Buenos Aires
 Barracas Central
 Sportivo Barracas
 Barracas, Castellón, Spain